The 1987 NHK Trophy was held in Kushiro. Medals were awarded in the disciplines of men's singles, ladies' singles, pair skating, and ice dancing.

Results

Men

Ladies

Pairs

Ice dancing

External links
 1987 NHK Trophy

Nhk Trophy, 1987
NHK Trophy